Trailer Park is a marketing firm with digital and print production capabilities that specializes in the media and entertainment industries, but works to some extent in other industries as well.

Among the firm's entertainment clients are Twentieth Century Studios, Walt Disney Pictures, Marvel Studios, Warner Bros. Pictures, Universal Picture, Netflix, Columbia Pictures, ABC, AMC, Buena Vista Home Entertainment, Paramount, E! Entertainment Television, Nickelodeon and many others. It has other clients also:  the brand side, clients include 10x10’s Girl Rising, American Cancer Society, AMD, Bolthouse Farms, Coda Automotive, ING Direct, JoyJars/Children’s Pediatric Cancer, Newegg.com, Toshiba and Vail Resorts.

History 
Trailer Park was founded in 1994. Originally, Trailer Park specialized in comedy. The firm expanded into other sectors of the entertainment industry. It was an early entrant into marketing for in-home video.

In February 2005, the Chicago-based private equity firm Lake Capital invested in Trailer Park. In December 2005, Trailer Park merged with Creative Domain, a large agency with a digital division. In July 2007, Trailer Park entered another merger with Art Machine, a leading print design agency.

In Spring 2008, the firm hired its current CEO, Rick Eiserman, who had previously been Managing Director of Young & Rubicam, Southern California, and Co-Founder of BrandBuzz NY.

The next acquisition, in 2010, was   goodness Mfg. (February, 2010), an advertising firm known for major brand-oriented campaigns.

CFO Doug Troy was recognized as 2012 CFO of the Year by the Los Angeles Business Journal in the Small Private Company category.

Trailer Park’s marketing offering spans Theatrical, Home Entertainment, Television, Print & Design, Digital, Social, Mobile, Interactive TV, Menus, Content, Digital Publishing, Video Games and Brand.

In November 2022, it was announced Trailer Park had acquired the London-based creative agency, MXW Studios.

Recent awards 
Trailer Park won “Best Anime” for The Secret World of Arrietty at the 13th annual Golden Trailer Awards. The company also received 8 nominations.

Trailer Park earned 10 nominations and eight awards at the 41st Annual Key Art Awards show, including a Gold in the Integrated Category for Warner Bros.’ The Dark Knight Rises.

In 2012, the firm received Clio Awards in both sound design and cinematography for Bethesda Softworks’ Prey 2.

References

External links
 Trailer Park Official Website

Companies based in Los Angeles County, California
Privately held companies based in California